Charlene J. Marshall (born September 17, 1933) was a Democratic member of the West Virginia House of Delegates, representing the 44th District from 2004 until 2014 and served as House Chaplain since 2004 as well. She earlier served as a Delegate from 1998 through 2002, and was the Mayor of Morgantown, West Virginia from 1991 until 1998.

External links
West Virginia Legislature - Delegate Charlene Marshall official government website
Project Vote Smart - Representative Charlene J. Marshall (WV) profile
Follow the Money - Charlene Marshall
2008 2006 2004 2002 2000 1998 campaign contributions

Members of the West Virginia House of Delegates
Mayors of Morgantown, West Virginia
1933 births
Living people
African-American mayors in West Virginia
African-American state legislators in West Virginia
Women mayors of places in West Virginia
Women state legislators in West Virginia
21st-century African-American people
21st-century African-American women
20th-century African-American people
20th-century African-American women
African-American women mayors